Cerodrillia brasiliensis is a species of sea snail, a marine gastropod mollusc in the family Drilliidae.

Description
The length of the shell varies between 5.5 mm and 9.5 mm.

Distribution
This marine species occurs off South Brasil.

References

 Fallon P.J. (2016). Taxonomic review of tropical western Atlantic shallow water Drilliidae (Mollusca: Gastropoda: Conoidea) including descriptions of 100 new species. Zootaxa. 4090(1): 1–363

External links
 

brasiliensis
Gastropods described in 2016